A thought experiment is a hypothetical situation in which a hypothesis, theory, or principle is laid out for the purpose of thinking through its consequences.

History 
The ancient Greek , "was the most ancient pattern of mathematical proof", and existed before Euclidean mathematics, where the emphasis was on the conceptual, rather than on the experimental part of a thought-experiment.

Johann Witt-Hansen established that Hans Christian Ørsted was the first to use the term  (from German: 'thought experiment') circa 1812. Ørsted was also the first to use the equivalent term  in 1820.

Physical and mental experimentation could then be contrasted: Mach asked his students to provide him with explanations whenever the results from their subsequent, real, physical experiment differed from those of their prior, imaginary experiment.

The English term thought experiment was coined (as a calque) from Mach's , and it first appeared in the 1897 English translation of one of Mach's papers. Prior to its emergence, the activity of posing hypothetical questions that employed subjunctive reasoning had existed for a very long time (for both scientists and philosophers). The irrealis moods are ways to categorize it or to speak about it. This helps explain the extremely wide and diverse range of the application of the term "thought experiment" once it had been introduced into English.

Perhaps the key experiment in the history of modern science is Galileo's demonstration that falling objects must fall at the same rate regardless of their masses. This is widely thought  to have been a straightforward physical demonstration, involving climbing up the Leaning Tower of Pisa and dropping two heavyweights off it, whereas in fact, it was a logical demonstration, using the 'thought experiment' technique.

Although the extract does not convey the elegance and power of the 'demonstration' terribly well, it is clear that it is a 'thought' experiment, rather than a practical one. Strange then, as Cohen says, that philosophers and scientists alike refuse to acknowledge either Galileo in particular or the thought experiment technique in general for its pivotal role in both science and philosophy. (The exception proves the rule – the iconoclastic philosopher of science, Paul Feyerabend, has also observed this methodological prejudice.) Instead, many philosophers prefer to consider 'Thought Experiments' to be merely the use of a hypothetical scenario to help understand the way things are.

Uses
The common goal of a thought experiment is to explore the potential consequences of the principle in question:

Given the structure of the experiment, it may not be possible to perform it, and even if it could be performed, there need not be an intention to perform it.

Examples of thought experiments include Schrödinger's cat, illustrating quantum indeterminacy through the manipulation of a perfectly sealed environment and a tiny bit of radioactive substance, and Maxwell's demon, which attempts to demonstrate the ability of a hypothetical finite being to violate the 2nd law of thermodynamics.

It is a common element of science-fiction stories.

Thought experiments, which are well-structured, well-defined hypothetical questions that employ subjunctive reasoning (irrealis moods) – "What might happen (or, what might have happened) if . . . " – have been used to pose questions in philosophy at least since Greek antiquity, some pre-dating Socrates. In physics and other sciences many thought experiments date from the 19th and especially the 20th Century, but examples can be found at least as early as Galileo.

In thought experiments, we gain new information by rearranging or reorganizing already known empirical data in a new way and drawing new (a priori) inferences from them or by looking at these data from a different and unusual perspective. In Galileo's thought experiment, for example, the rearrangement of empirical experience consists of the original idea of combining bodies of different weights.

Thought experiments have been used in philosophy (especially ethics), physics, and other fields (such as cognitive psychology, history, political science, economics, social psychology, law, organizational studies, marketing, and epidemiology).  In law, the synonym "hypothetical" is frequently used for such experiments.

Regardless of their intended goal, all thought experiments display a patterned way of thinking that is designed to allow us to explain, predict and control events in a better and more productive way.

Theoretical consequences
In terms of their theoretical consequences, thought experiments generally:

 challenge (or even refute) a prevailing theory, often involving the device known as reductio ad absurdum, (as in Galileo's original argument, a proof by contradiction),
 confirm a prevailing theory,
 establish a new theory, or
 simultaneously refute a prevailing theory and establish a new theory through a process of mutual exclusion

Practical applications
Thought experiments can produce some very important and different outlooks on previously unknown or unaccepted theories. However, they may make those theories themselves irrelevant, and could possibly create new problems that are just as difficult, or possibly more difficult to resolve.

In terms of their practical application, thought experiments are generally created to:

 challenge the prevailing status quo (which includes activities such as correcting misinformation (or misapprehension), identify flaws in the argument(s) presented, to  preserve (for the long-term) objectively established fact, and to refute  specific assertions that some particular thing is permissible, forbidden, known, believed, possible, or necessary);
extrapolate beyond (or interpolate within) the boundaries of already established fact;
predict and forecast the (otherwise) indefinite and unknowable future;
 explain the past;
 the retrodiction, postdiction and hindcasting of the (otherwise) indefinite and unknowable past;
 facilitate decision making, choice, and strategy selection;
 solve problems, and generate ideas;
 move current (often insoluble) problems into another, more helpful, and more productive problem space (e.g.: functional fixedness);
 attribute causation, preventability, blame, and responsibility for specific outcomes;
 assess culpability and compensatory damages in social and legal contexts;
 ensure the repeat of past success; or
 examine the extent to which past events might have occurred differently.
 ensure the (future) avoidance of past failures

Types 

Generally speaking, there are seven types of thought experiments in which one reasons from causes to effects, or effects to causes:

Prefactual
Prefactual (before the fact) thought experiments – the term prefactual was coined by Lawrence J. Sanna in 1998 — speculate on possible future outcomes, given the present, and ask "What will be the outcome if event E occurs?"

Counterfactual

Counterfactual (contrary to established fact) thought experiments – the term counterfactual was coined by Nelson Goodman in 1947, extending Roderick Chisholm's (1946) notion of a "contrary-to-fact conditional" – speculate on the possible outcomes of a different past; and ask "What might have happened if A had happened instead of B?" (e.g., "If Isaac Newton and Gottfried Leibniz  had  cooperated with each other, what would mathematics look like today?").

The study of counterfactual speculation has increasingly engaged the interest of scholars in a wide range of domains such as philosophy, psychology, cognitive psychology, history, political science, economics, social psychology, law, organizational theory, marketing, and epidemiology.

Semifactual

Semifactual thought experiments – the term semifactual was coined by Nelson Goodman in 1947 – speculate on the extent to which things might have remained the same, despite there being a different past; and asks the question Even though X happened instead of E, would Y have still occurred? (e.g., Even if the goalie had moved left, rather than right, could he have intercepted a ball that was traveling at such a speed?).

Semifactual speculations are an important part of clinical medicine.

Predictive

The activity of prediction attempts to project the circumstances of the present into the future. According to David Sarewitz and Roger Pielke (1999, p123), scientific prediction takes two forms:

 "The elucidation of invariant — and therefore predictive — principles of nature"; and
 "[Using] suites of observational data and sophisticated numerical models in an effort to foretell the behavior or evolution of complex phenomena".

Although they perform different social and scientific functions, the only difference between the qualitatively identical activities of predicting, forecasting, and nowcasting is the distance of the speculated future from the present moment occupied by the user. Whilst the activity of nowcasting, defined as "a detailed description of the current weather along with forecasts obtained by extrapolation up to 2 hours ahead", is essentially concerned with describing the current state of affairs, it is common practice to extend the term "to cover very-short-range forecasting up to 12 hours ahead" (Browning, 1982, p.ix).

Hindcasting

The activity of hindcasting involves running a forecast model after an event has happened in order to test whether the model's simulation is valid.

Retrodiction

The activity of retrodiction (or postdiction) involves moving backward in time, step-by-step, in as many stages as are considered necessary, from the present into the speculated past to establish the ultimate cause of a specific event (e.g., reverse engineering and forensics).

Given that retrodiction is a process in which "past observations, events, add  and data are used as evidence to infer the process(es) that produced them" and that diagnosis "involve[s] going from visible effects such as symptoms, signs and the like to their prior causes", the essential balance between prediction and retrodiction could be characterized as:

regardless of whether the prognosis is of the course of the disease in the absence of treatment, or of the application of a specific treatment regimen to a specific disorder in a particular patient.

Backcasting

The activity of backcasting – the term backcasting was coined by John Robinson in 1982 — involves establishing the description of a very definite and very specific future situation. It then involves an imaginary moving backward in time, step-by-step, in as many stages as are considered necessary, from the future to the present to reveal the mechanism through which that particular specified future could be attained from the present.

Backcasting is not concerned with predicting the future:

According to Jansen (1994, p. 503:

Fields 
Thought experiments have been used in a variety of fields, including philosophy, law, physics, and mathematics. In philosophy they have been used at least since classical antiquity, some pre-dating Socrates. In law, they were well known to Roman lawyers quoted in the Digest. In physics and other sciences, notable thought experiments date from the 19th and especially the 20th century, but examples can be found at least as early as Galileo.

Philosophy 
In philosophy, a thought experiment typically presents an imagined scenario with the intention of eliciting an intuitive or reasoned response about the way things are in the thought experiment.  (Philosophers might also supplement their thought experiments with theoretical reasoning designed to support the desired intuitive response.)  The scenario will typically be designed to target a particular philosophical notion, such as morality, or the nature of the mind or linguistic reference.  The response to the imagined scenario is supposed to tell us about the nature of that notion in any scenario, real or imagined.

For example, a thought experiment might present a situation in which an agent intentionally kills an innocent for the benefit of others.  Here, the relevant question is not whether the action is moral or not, but more broadly whether a moral theory is correct that says morality is determined solely by an action's consequences (See Consequentialism).  John Searle imagines a man in a locked room who receives written sentences in Chinese, and returns written sentences in Chinese, according to a sophisticated instruction manual.  Here, the relevant question is not whether or not the man understands Chinese, but more broadly, whether a functionalist theory of mind is correct.

It is generally hoped that there is universal agreement about the intuitions that a thought experiment elicits.  (Hence, in assessing their own thought experiments, philosophers may appeal to "what we should say," or some such locution.)  A successful thought experiment will be one in which intuitions about it are widely shared.  But often, philosophers differ in their intuitions about the scenario.

Other philosophical uses of imagined scenarios arguably are thought experiments also.  In one use of scenarios, philosophers might imagine persons in a particular situation (maybe ourselves), and ask what they would do.

For example, in the veil of ignorance, John Rawls asks us to imagine a group of persons in a situation where they know nothing about themselves, and are charged with devising a social or political organization. The use of the state of nature to imagine the origins of government, as by Thomas Hobbes and John Locke, may also be considered a thought experiment. Søren Kierkegaard explored the possible ethical and religious implications of Abraham's binding of Isaac in Fear and Trembling. Similarly, Friedrich Nietzsche, in On the Genealogy of Morals, speculated about the historical development of Judeo-Christian morality, with the intent of questioning its legitimacy.

An early written thought experiment was Plato's allegory of the cave. Another historic thought experiment was Avicenna's "Floating Man" thought experiment in the 11th century. He asked his readers to imagine themselves suspended in the air isolated from all sensations in order to demonstrate human self-awareness and self-consciousness, and the substantiality of the soul.

Science 
Scientists tend to use thought experiments as imaginary, "proxy" experiments prior to a real, "physical" experiment (Ernst Mach always argued that these gedankenexperiments were "a necessary precondition for physical experiment"). In these cases, the result of the "proxy" experiment will often be so clear that there will be no need to conduct a physical experiment at all.

Scientists also use thought experiments when particular physical experiments are impossible to conduct (Carl Gustav Hempel labeled these sorts of experiment "theoretical experiments-in-imagination"), such as Einstein's thought experiment of chasing a light beam, leading to special relativity.  This is a unique use of a scientific thought experiment, in that it was never carried out, but led to a successful theory, proven by other empirical means.

Properties
Further categorization of thought experiments can be attributed to specific properties.

Possibility
In many thought experiments, the scenario would be nomologically possible, or possible according to the laws of nature. John Searle's Chinese room is nomologically possible.

Some thought experiments present scenarios that are not nomologically possible. In his Twin Earth thought experiment, Hilary Putnam asks us to imagine a scenario in which there is a substance with all of the observable properties of water (e.g., taste, color, boiling point), but is chemically different from water.  It has been argued that this thought experiment is not nomologically possible, although it may be possible in some other sense, such as metaphysical possibility.  It is debatable whether the nomological impossibility of a thought experiment renders intuitions about it moot.

In some cases, the hypothetical scenario might be considered metaphysically impossible, or impossible in any sense at all. David Chalmers says that we can imagine that there are zombies, or persons who are physically identical to us in every way but who lack consciousness. This is supposed to show that physicalism is false. However, some argue that zombies are inconceivable:  we can no more imagine a zombie than we can imagine that 1+1=3. Others have claimed that the conceivability of a scenario may not entail its possibility.

Causal reasoning 
The first characteristic pattern that thought experiments display is their orientation
in time. They are either:

Antefactual speculations: experiments that speculate about what might have happened prior to a specific, designated event, or
Postfactual speculations: experiments that speculate about what may happen subsequent to (or consequent upon) a specific, designated event.

The second characteristic pattern is their movement in time in relation to "the present
moment standpoint" of the individual performing the experiment; namely, in terms of:

 Their temporal direction: are they past-oriented or future-oriented?
 Their temporal sense:
(a) in the case of past-oriented thought experiments, are they examining the consequences of temporal "movement" from the present to the past, or from the past to the present? or,
(b) in the case of future-oriented thought experiments, are they examining the consequences of temporal "movement" from the present to the future, or from the future to the present?

Relation to real experiments
The relation to real experiments can be quite complex, as can be seen again from an example going back to Albert Einstein. In 1935, with two coworkers, he published a paper on a newly created subject called later the EPR effect (EPR paradox). In this paper, starting from certain philosophical assumptions, on the basis of a rigorous analysis of a certain, complicated, but in the meantime assertedly realizable model, he came to the conclusion that  quantum mechanics should be described as "incomplete". Niels Bohr asserted a refutation of Einstein's analysis immediately, and his view prevailed. After some decades, it was asserted that feasible experiments could prove the error of the EPR paper. These experiments tested the Bell inequalities published in 1964 in a purely theoretical paper. The above-mentioned EPR philosophical starting assumptions were considered to be falsified by the empirical fact (e.g. by the optical real experiments of  Alain Aspect).

Thus thought experiments belong to a theoretical discipline, usually to theoretical physics, but often to theoretical philosophy. In any case, it must be distinguished from a real experiment, which belongs naturally to the experimental discipline and has "the final decision on true or not true", at least in physics.

Interactivity
Thought experiments can also be interactive where the author invites people into his thought process through providing alternative paths with alternative outcomes within the narrative, or through interaction with a programmed machine, like a computer program.

Thanks to the advent of the Internet, the digital space has lent itself as a new medium for a new kind of thought experiments. The philosophical work of Stefano Gualeni, for example, focuses on the use of virtual worlds to materialize thought experiments and to playfully negotiate philosophical ideas. His arguments were originally presented in his book Virtual Worlds as Philosophical Tools.

Gualeni's argument is that the history of philosophy has, until recently, merely been the history of written thought, and digital media can complement and enrich the limited and almost exclusively linguistic approach to philosophical thought. He considers virtual worlds to be philosophically viable and advantageous in contexts like those of thought experiments, when the recipients of a certain philosophical notion or perspective are expected to objectively test and evaluate different possible courses of action, or in cases where they are confronted with interrogatives concerning non-actual or non-human phenomenologies.

Examples

Humanities

 Doomsday argument (anthropic principle)
 The Lady, or the Tiger? (human nature)
 The beer question (U.S. politics)

Physics

 Bell's spaceship paradox (special relativity)
 Brownian ratchet (Richard Feynman's "perpetual motion" machine that does not violate the second law and does no work at thermal equilibrium)
 Bucket argument – argues that space is absolute, not relational
 Dyson sphere
 Einstein's box
 Elitzur–Vaidman bomb-tester (quantum mechanics)
 EPR paradox (quantum mechanics) (forms of this have been performed)
 Feynman sprinkler (classical mechanics)
 Galileo's Leaning Tower of Pisa experiment (rebuttal of Aristotelian Gravity)
 Galileo's ship (classical relativity principle) 1632
 GHZ experiment (quantum mechanics)
 Heisenberg's microscope (quantum mechanics)
 Kepler's Dream (change of point of view as support for the Copernican hypothesis)
 Ladder paradox (special relativity)
 Laplace's demon
 Maxwell's demon (thermodynamics) 1871
 Moving magnet and conductor problem
 Newton's cannonball (Newton's laws of motion)
 Popper's experiment (quantum mechanics)
 Quantum pseudo telepathy (quantum mechanics)
 Quantum suicide and immortality (quantum mechanics)
 Renninger negative-result experiment (quantum mechanics)
 Schrödinger's cat (quantum mechanics)
 Sticky bead argument (general relativity)
 The Monkey and the Hunter (gravitation)
 Twin paradox (special relativity)
 Wheeler's delayed choice experiment (quantum mechanics)
 Wigner's friend (quantum mechanics)

Philosophy 

 Artificial brain
 Avicenna's Floating Man
 Beetle in a box
 Bellum omnium contra omnes
 Big Book (ethics)
 Brain-in-a-vat (epistemology, philosophy of mind)
 Brainstorm machine
 Buridan's ass
 Changing places  (reflexive monism, philosophy of mind)
 China brain (physicalism, philosophy of mind)
 Chinese room (philosophy of mind, artificial intelligence, cognitive science)
 Coherence (philosophical gambling strategy)
 Condillac's Statue (epistemology)
 Experience machine (ethics)
 Gettier problem (epistemology)
 Ḥayy ibn Yaqẓān (epistemology)
 Hilary Putnam's Twin Earth thought experiment in the philosophy of language and philosophy of mind
 If a tree falls in a forest
 Inverted spectrum
 Kavka's toxin puzzle
 Mary's room (philosophy of mind)
 Molyneux's Problem (admittedly, this oscillated between empirical and a-priori assessment)
 Newcomb's paradox
 Original position (politics)
 Philosophical zombie (philosophy of mind, artificial intelligence, cognitive science)
 Plank of Carneades
 Roko's basilisk
 Ship of Theseus, The (concept of identity)
 Shoemaker's "Time Without Change" (metaphysics)
 Simulated reality (philosophy, computer science, cognitive science)
 Social contract theories
 Survival lottery  (ethics)
 Swamp man (personal identity, philosophy of mind)
 Teleportation (metaphysics)
 The transparent eyeball
 The violinist (ethics)
 Ticking time bomb scenario (ethics)
 Trolley problem (ethics)
 Utility monster (ethics)
 Zeno's paradoxes (classical Greek problems of the infinite)

Mathematics

 Balls and vase problem (infinity and cardinality)
 Gabriel's Horn (infinity)
 Hilbert's paradox of the Grand Hotel (infinity)
 Infinite monkey theorem (probability)
 Lottery paradox (probability)
 Sleeping beauty paradox (probability)

Biology
 Levinthal paradox
 Rotating locomotion in living systems

Computer science

 Braitenberg vehicles (robotics, neural control and sensing systems) (some have been built)
 Dining Philosophers (computer science)
 Halting problem (limits of computability)
 Turing machine (limits of computability)
 Two Generals' Problem

Economics
 Broken window fallacy (law of unintended consequences, opportunity cost)
 Laffer Curve

See also

 Alternate history
 Aporia
 Black box
 Brainstorm machine
 Ding an sich
 Einstein's thought experiments
 Futures studies
 Futures techniques
 Heuristic
 Intuition pump
 Mathematical proof
 N-universes
 Possible world
 Scenario planning
 Scenario test
 Theoretical physics

Notes

References

Further reading

 Brendal, Elke, "Intuition Pumps and the Proper Use of Thought Experiments", Dialectica, Vol.58, No.1, (March 2004, pp.89–108.
 Ćorić, Dragana (2020), "The Importance of Thought Experiments", Journal of Eastern-European Criminal Law, Vol.2020, No.1, (2020), pp. 127–135.
 Cucic, D.A. & Nikolic, A.S., "A short insight about thought experiment in modern physics", 6th International Conference of the Balkan Physical Union BPU6, Istanbul – Turkey, 2006.
 Dennett, D.C., "Intuition Pumps", pp. 180–197 in Brockman, J., The Third Culture: Beyond the Scientific Revolution, Simon & Schuster, (New York), 1995. 
 Galton, F., "Statistics of Mental Imagery", Mind, Vol.5, No.19, (July 1880), pp. 301–318.
 Hempel, C.G., "Typological Methods in the Natural and Social Sciences", pp. 155–171 in Hempel, C.G. (ed.), Aspects of Scientific Explanation and Other Essays in the Philosophy of Science, The Free Press, (New York), 1965.
 Jacques, V., Wu, E., Grosshans, F., Treussart, F., Grangier, P. Aspect, A., & Roch, J. (2007). Experimental Realization of Wheeler's Delayed-Choice Gedanken Experiment, Science, 315, p. 966–968.
 Kuhn, T., "A Function for Thought Experiments", in The Essential Tension (Chicago: University of Chicago Press, 1979), pp. 240–265.
 Mach, E., "On Thought Experiments", pp. 134–147 in Mach, E., Knowledge and Error: Sketches on the Psychology of Enquiry, D. Reidel Publishing Co., (Dordrecht), 1976. [Translation of Erkenntnis und Irrtum (5th edition, 1926.].
 Popper, K., "On the Use and Misuse of Imaginary Experiments, Especially in Quantum Theory", pp. 442–456, in Popper, K., The Logic of Scientific Discovery, Harper Torchbooks, (New York), 1968.
 Stuart, M. T., Fehige, Y. and Brown, J. R. (2018). The Routledge Companion to Thought Experiments. London: Routledge. 
 Witt-Hansen, J., "H.C. Ørsted, Immanuel Kant and the Thought Experiment", Danish Yearbook of Philosophy, Vol.13, (1976), pp. 48–65.

Bibliography

 Adams, Scott, God's Debris: A Thought Experiment, Andrews McMeel Publishing, (USA), 2001
 Browning, K.A. (ed.), Nowcasting, Academic Press, (London), 1982.
 Buzzoni, M., Thought Experiment in the Natural Sciences, Koenigshausen+Neumann, Wuerzburg 2008
 Cohen, Martin, "Wittgenstein's Beetle and Other Classic Thought Experiments", Blackwell (Oxford) 2005
 Cohnitz, D., Gedankenexperimente in der Philosophie, Mentis Publ., (Paderborn, Germany), 2006.
 Craik, K.J.W., The Nature of Explanation, Cambridge University Press, (Cambridge), 1943.
 Cushing, J.T., Philosophical Concepts in Physics: The Historical Relation Between Philosophy and Scientific Theories, Cambridge University Press, (Cambridge), 1998.
 DePaul, M. & Ramsey, W. (eds.), Rethinking Intuition: The Psychology of Intuition and Its Role in Philosophical Inquiry, Rowman & Littlefield Publishers, (Lanham), 1998.
 Gendler, T.S. & Hawthorne, J., Conceivability and Possibility, Oxford University Press, (Oxford), 2002.
 Gendler, T.S., Thought Experiment: On the Powers and Limits of Imaginary Cases, Garland, (New York), 2000.
 Häggqvist, S., Thought Experiments in Philosophy, Almqvist & Wiksell International, (Stockholm), 1996.
 Hanson, N.R., Patterns of Discovery: An Inquiry into the Conceptual Foundations of Science, Cambridge University Press, (Cambridge), 1962.
 Harper, W.L., Stalnaker, R. & Pearce, G. (eds.), Ifs: Conditionals, Belief, Decision, Chance, and Time, D. Reidel Publishing Co., (Dordrecht), 1981.
 Hesse, M.B., Models and Analogies in Science, Sheed and Ward, (London), 1963.
 Holyoak, K.J. & Thagard, P., Mental Leaps: Analogy in Creative Thought, A Bradford Book, The MIT Press, (Cambridge), 1995.
 Horowitz, T. & Massey, G.J. (eds.), Thought Experiments in Science and Philosophy, Rowman & Littlefield, (Savage), 1991.
 Kahn, H., Thinking About the Unthinkable, Discus Books, (New York), 1971.
 Kuhne, U., Die Methode des Gedankenexperiments, Suhrkamp Publ., (Frankfurt/M, Germany), 2005.
 Leatherdale, W.H., The Role of Analogy, Model and Metaphor in Science, North-Holland Publishing Company, (Amsterdam), 1974.
 . Translated to English by Karen Jelved, Andrew D. Jackson, and Ole Knudsen, (translators 1997).
 Roese, N.J. & Olson, J.M. (eds.), What Might Have Been: The Social Psychology of Counterfactual Thinking, Lawrence Erlbaum Associates, (Mahwah), 1995.
 Shanks, N. (ed.), Idealization IX: Idealization in Contemporary Physics (Poznan Studies in the Philosophy of the Sciences and the Humanities, Volume 63), Rodopi, (Amsterdam), 1998.
 Shick, T. & Vaugn, L., Doing Philosophy: An Introduction through Thought Experiments (Second Edition), McGraw Hill, (New York), 2003.
 Sorensen, R.A., Thought Experiments, Oxford University Press, (Oxford), 1992.
 Tetlock, P.E. & Belkin, A. (eds.), Counterfactual Thought Experiments in World Politics, Princeton University Press, (Princeton), 1996.
 Thomson, J.J. {Parent, W. (ed.)}, Rights, Restitution, and Risks: Essays in Moral Theory, Harvard University Press, (Cambridge), 1986.
 Vosniadou, S. & Ortony. A. (eds.), Similarity and Analogical Reasoning, Cambridge University Press, (Cambridge), 1989.
 Wilkes, K.V., Real People: Personal Identity without Thought Experiments, Oxford University Press, (Oxford), 1988.
 Yeates, L.B., Thought Experimentation: A Cognitive Approach,  Graduate Diploma in Arts (By Research) Dissertation, University of New South Wales, 2004.

External links 

 
 
 Stevinus, Galileo, and Thought Experiments Short essay by S. Abbas Raza of 3 Quarks Daily
 Thought experiment generator, a visual aid to running your own thought experiment

 
Calques
Conceptual modelling
Critical thinking
History of philosophy
History of science
Imagination
Philosophical arguments
Philosophical methodology
Sources of knowledge